The Pointe de Paray is a mountain of the Swiss Prealps, located on the border between the cantons of Fribourg and Vaud. It has a height of 2,375 metres above sea level, making it both the third highest summit of the Vanil Noir massif and the canton of Fribourg. The mountain lies approximately halfway between the Vanil de l'Ecri and the Gros Perré.

The closest localities are Grandvillard (Fribourg) and Château d'Oex (Vaud).

References

External links
Pointe de Paray on Hikr

Mountains of the canton of Vaud
Mountains of the canton of Fribourg
Mountains of the Alps
Fribourg–Vaud border
Mountains of Switzerland
Two-thousanders of Switzerland